The , acronym MEXT, also known as Monka-shō, is one of the eleven Ministries of Japan that composes part of the executive branch of the Government of Japan.  Its goal is to improve the development of Japan in relation with the international community. The ministry is responsible for funding research under its jurisdiction, some of which includes: children's health in relation to home environment, delta-sigma modulations utilizing graphs, gender equality in sciences, neutrino detection which contributes to the study of supernovas around the world, and other general research for the future.

History 
The Meiji government created the first Ministry of Education in 1871. In January 2001, the former Ministry of Education, Science, Sports and Culture and the former  merged to become the present MEXT.

Organization 
The Ministry of Education, Culture, Sports, Science and Technology currently is led by the Minister of Education, Culture, Sports, Science and Technology. Under that position is two State Ministers, two Parliamentary Vice-Ministers, and Administrative Vice-Minister, and two Deputy Ministers. Beyond that the organization is divided as follows.

Minister's Secretariat 
The Minister's Secretariat is the department that manages general policies that affect the Ministry of Education, Culture, Sports, Science and Technology as a whole. These functions include many administrative jobs such as auditing policies, community relations, and overall human resource management for domestic and international relations alike.

Director-General for International Affairs 
The Director-General for International Affairs, according to  Ministry of Education, Culture, Sports, Science and Technology's site, is the main point of contact between Japan's National Commission and United Nations Educational Scientific and Cultural Organization (UNESCO). The collective goal of the two organizations is to create mutual, sustainable development through education, science, and culture.

Department of Facilities Planning and Disaster Prevention 
The Department of Facilities Planning and Disaster Prevention is in charge of focusing on the ability of school facilities to reduce damage caused by disasters such as earthquakes. On top of this, Ministry of Education, Culture, Sports, Science and Technology's site, also describes part of their duties as promoting  universities' endeavors in educational and research activities.

Education departments 

These are the segments of the Ministry with focus on the Education portions of organization.

Education Policy Bureau 
The Education Policy Bureau as a department upholds the concept of lifelong learning, introduced in the Basic Act on Education. Ministry of Education, Culture, Sports, Science and Technology describes this department's duties as designing educational policy based on comprehensive and objective evidence.

Elementary and Secondary Education Bureau 
The Elementary and Secondary Education Bureau is in charge of enhancing the educational development of students progressing through preschool to upper secondary schools, or any equivalent.

Higher Education Bureau 
The Ministry of Education, Culture, Sports, Science and Technology describes the Higher Education Bureau as a department that focuses on promoting the education of undergraduate and graduate schools. This includes overseeing permission of grants, teacher quality, as well as the selection and admission of both domestic and abroad students.

Sports and Culture Departments 

These are the segments of the Ministry with focus on the Sports and Culture portions of organization.

Japan Sports Agency 
The Japan Sports Agency is tasked with the promotion of physical education and health, as well as maintaining the country's ability to compete in international athletics.

Agency for Cultural Affairs 

The Japanese Agency for Cultural Affairs tries to create a culture in the country that encourages participation in cultural activities and the arts. Their goal is to achieve a "Nation Based on Culture and Art".

Science and Technology Departments 
These are the segments of the Ministry with focus on the Science and Technology portions of organization.

Science and Technology Policy Bureau 

The Ministry of Education, Culture, Sports, Science and Technology's site regards the duties of the Science and Technology Policy Bureau as the department in charge of the promotion of science and technology in the country. The scope of the department includes students as well as established professionals.

Research Promotion Bureau 
The Research Promotion Bureau is a department that focuses on development of scientific research, as well as research in fields including technology and physics.

Research and Development Bureau 
The Research and Development Bureau is slightly different than the Research Promotion Bureau as this department focuses on social problems including energy and the environment. Consequentially, this department would focus on exploration in space and deep sea.

Activities and funded research 
While the Ministry of Education, Culture, Sports, Science and Technology currently contains multiple agencies, primarily a congregation of Education, Culture, Sports, Science and Technology, it actually began as the Ministry of Education. Over the years, Japan separately created each of the agencies that would eventually combine to make the current organization. Nonetheless, each department of the Ministry of Education, Culture, Sports, Science and Technology researches programs and institutions to fund.

Children's health in relation to home environment 
During this research, the Ministry of Education, Culture, Sports, Science and Technology concluded there were many intertwined dependencies between family homes, their environment, and how it impacts a child's growth and maturity.

Delta-sigma conversion for graphing 
The Ministry of Education, Culture, Sports, Science and Technology have also been responsible in directly, although not fully, funding research into delta-sigma modulation, which in summary describes the graphing of analog-digital information to aid in the conversion of the two means.

Educational research 
The Ministry of Education, Culture, Sports, Science and Technology, were able to get their funding increased successfully through the years. They did so with the aid of one of their subgroups, the Japan Society for the Promotion of Science. The additional funds were likely aided in approval due to their source coming from national bonds rather than taxes. The programs, funded by the increased budget, include projects in new materials, molecular-scale surface dynamics, next-generation process technology, computer science, synthesis-based chemical engineering science, micro-mechatronics (micromachinery), biotechnology, human genome research, cell signaling, bioinformatics, brain research, Structural biology, life sciences, developmental biology, and biomedical engineering.

Educational programs
MEXT is one of three ministries that run the JET Programme. It also offers the Monbukagakusho Scholarship, also known as the MEXT or Monbu-shō scholarship. The Ministry sets standards for the romanization of Japanese.

In cooperation with the Japanese Student Services Organization (JASSO), the ministry further funds the prestigious JASSO scholarship for international students which has been described as the "Japanese Fulbright program". It offers financial support of up to 80.000¥ per month for the top 1% of students of any foreign country for studies at a Japanese university.

MEXT provides the Children Living Abroad and Returnees Internet (CLARINET) which provides information to Japanese families living abroad.

MEXT sends teachers around the world to serve in nihonjin gakkō, full-time Japanese international schools in foreign countries. The Japanese government also sends full-time teachers to hoshū jugyō kō supplementary schools that offer lessons that are similar to those of nihonjin gakkō or those which each have student bodies of 100 students or greater. In addition, MEXT subsidizes weekend schools which each have over 100 students.

Japanese Government MEXT scholarship 2022 Japanese Government MEXT Scholarship 2021 Embassy Recommendation. The scholarship programs are for students who wish to study in Japan as Research Student (Masters/Ph.D./ Research), Undergraduate student, College of Technology student, or Specialized Training student.

See also
 National Spiritual Mobilization Movement
 Education in Japan
 Fundamental Law of Education
 History of education in Japan
 Japanese history textbook controversies
 Monbukagakusho Scholarship

References

External links 

 Japan Links Sites Monbukagakusho
 Monka-shō Official English Webpage
 The Government of Japan - Monbukagakusho
 List of Ministers (The Cabinet) | Prime Minister of Japan and His Cabinet"
 Press release on Legislation of "the National University Corporation Law"

1871 establishments in Japan
Chiyoda, Tokyo
Japan
Education laws and guidelines in Japan
Japan
Education, Culture, Sports, Science And Technology
Japan, Education, Culture, Sports, Science And Technology
Science and technology in Japan
Japan
Japan